Ben Gurion Airport railway station (Tahanat HaRakevet Nemal HaTe'ufa Ben Gurion) is an Israel Railways station located in the lower level of Ben Gurion International Airport's Terminal 3. The station opened on 10 October 2004, together with the opening of Terminal 3. The railway line extending to the northwest from the station connects it to Tel Aviv and points north, while in the other direction from the station the railway splits south to Lod and southeast to Modi'in and Jerusalem.

Services

The station currently serves three passenger lines. In August 2019, it handled an average of approximately 22 thousand passengers per day, but its ridership declined severely with the advent of COVID-19 travel restrictions.

Nahariya – Haifa – Tel Aviv – Modi'in
The rail journey from Ben Gurion Airport to Tel Aviv Savidor Central station takes 15–20 minutes (with intermediate stops at Tel Aviv's HaShalom and HaHagana stations). Most Northbound trains from the airport then continue past Tel Aviv and terminate in Nahariya in northern Israel, making stops in Binyamina, Haifa, the Krayot and Acre (with a total journey time of about 2 hours from the airport to Nahariya). The service to and from Nahariya operates from 5 AM to 15 past Midnight the following day, except on Shabbat (i.e., from Friday evening to Saturday evenings) and on Jewish Holidays, operating twice per hour and in the opposite direction from the airport terminating in Modi'in to the southeast. Before the COVID-19 pandemic, the line operated 24 hours a day except on Shabbat and Jewish Holidays, and there was one train per hour from during late night and early morning.

Binyamina – Herzliya – Tel Aviv – Jerusalem
The station is a stop on the Tel Aviv–Jerusalem railway. Travel time from the airport to Navon station in Jerusalem is just under 25 minutes with trains running every 30 minutes during the day and evening. In the opposite direction daytime and evening trains terminate at the Herzliya railway station while making stops in Tel Aviv's railway stations. During late nights and early mornings the line operates once per hour and the service extends north of Hertzliya to also include stops in Netanya, Hadera West, and Binyamina. As of 2023, the line operates 24-hours a day, except during holidays, from Friday afternoon to Saturday evening, and from Wednesday night to early Thursday morning.

Night trains to southern Israel
Before the COVID-19 pandemic, during late nights and early mornings there was one train per hour to and from the airport terminating at Beersheba Center via Lod, Rehovot, Ashdod, Ashkelon and selected stops in between.

Future services
With the new fast line to Jerusalem and the current construction of two new railway lines (the new Eastern line and the new Rishon Lezion-Modi’in line) that will connect to the Ben Gurion Airport line, an extra  of double tracks will be added with new platforms on the southern side of the current station to accommodate the increase in traffic.

Station layout
Platform numbers increase in a North-to-South direction

Ridership

References

External links

Israel railways web site
 Station information on Israel railways web site
On the Platform - information website

Airport railway stations
Lod
Railway stations in Central District (Israel)
Railway stations opened in 2004
2004 establishments in Israel